Leaffishes are small fishes of the family Polycentridae. According to FishBase, it only includes the genera Monocirrhus and Polycentrus from fresh and brackish water in tropical South America. Although included in the Asian leaffish family Nandidae by FishBase, most recent authorities place the African Afronandus and Polycentropsis in Polycentridae. Polycentridae were formerly placed in the order Cichliformes but are now regarded as being incertae sedis in the subseries Ovalentaria in the clade Percomorpha.

All of these fishes are highly specialized ambush predators that resemble leaves, down to the point that their swimming style resembles a drifting leaf (thus the common name leaf fish); when a prey animal - such as an aquatic insect or smaller fish - comes within range, the fish attacks, swallowing the prey potentially within a quarter of a second. To aid in this lifestyle, all members of the family have large heads, cryptic colors, and very large protractile mouths capable of taking prey items nearly as large as they are. These intriguing behaviors have given the family a niche in the aquarium hobby; however, none of these species are easy to maintain in aquariums, requiring very clean, soft, acidic water and copious amounts of live foods.

Genera and species
 Genus Monocirrhus Heckel, 1840
 Monocirrhus polyacanthus Heckel, 1840 (Amazon leaffish)
 Genus Polycentrus Müller & Troschel, 1849
 Polycentrus jundia Coutinho & Wosiacki, 2014 
 Polycentrus schomburgkii Müller & Troschel, 1849 (Guyana leaffish)

References

 
Ovalentaria